Stalbridge Dock is a dock on the River Mersey at Garston, Liverpool, England opened in February 1909. It has direct access to the River Mersey and provides access to Old Dock, Garston, and thence also to North Dock, Garston. It is part of the Port of Garston.

References

External links
 https://web.archive.org/web/20051119104917/http://www.mersey-gateway.org/server.php?show=ConNarrative.37&chapterId=189
 MultiMap photo

Garston docks
Mersey docks